Oh Lonesome Me is a studio album by American country singer Don Gibson, released in 1958. It is an example of the beginning of the Nashville Sound. On November 17, 1958, it was rated No. 1 on Billboard magazine's "Favorite C&W Albums" based on the magazine's annual poll of country and western disc jockeys.

The title song reached the Top 10 and also topped the country chart. Its B-side was "I Can't Stop Loving You" which became a standard song for unrequited love.

The title song has been covered many times, most notably by Neil Young as part of the 1970 LP, After the Goldrush. M. Ward and Lucinda Williams performed it in 2009 for Hold Time.

Track listing

Personnel
Don Gibson – vocals, guitar
Hank Garland – guitar
Chet Atkins – guitar
Velma Williams Smith – guitar
Bob Moore – bass
Buddy Harman – drums
Floyd Cramer – piano
The Jordanaires, (Gordon Stoker, Hoyt Hawkins, Neal Matthews, Hugh Jarrett) - background vocals

References

1958 albums
Don Gibson albums
Albums produced by Chet Atkins
RCA Records albums